The 2015 Algarve Cup was the 22nd edition of the Algarve Cup, an invitational women's football tournament held annually in Portugal. It took place on 4–11 March.

Format
Because of the number of competitive teams this year, the format was changed. Previously Group C teams were unable to get into the final, which was played between Group A and B winners. This year however, the final was played between the two best group winners.

Points awarded in the group stage followed the standard formula of three points for a win, one point for a draw and zero points for a loss. In the case of two teams being tied on the same number of points in a group, their head-to-head result determine the higher place.

Teams
The participating teams were announced on 20 October 2014.

Match officials
The referees were announced on 20 February 2015.

Referees

  María Carvajal
  Qin Liang
  Jana Adámková
  Stéphanie Frappart
  Melissa Borjas
  Carina Vitulano
  Cardella Samuels
  Lucila Montes
  Ri Hyang-ok
  Cristina Dorcioman
  Abirami Naidu
  Esther Staubli
  Claudia Rodriguez
  Gladys Lengwe

Assistant referees

  Sarah Ho
  Ella De Vries
  Janette Arcanjo
  Loreto Cravero
  Cui Yongmei
  Liang Jianping
  Sanja Karšić
  Lucie Ratajová
  Manuela Nicolosi
  Chrysoula Kourompylia
  Princess Brown
  Stacy-Ann Greyson
  Bernadettar Kwimbira
  Enedina Gómez
  Lixy Guerrero
  Widiya Habibah Shamsuri
  Hong Kum-nyo
  Petruţa Iugulescu
  Kim Kyoung-min
  Yolanda Rodriguez
  Belinda Brem
  Susanne Küng
  Aywa Dzodope
  Natalia Rachynska
  Luciana Mascaraña
  Mariana Odone

Squads

Group stage
The groups were announced on 18 December 2014.

All times are local (UTC±00:00).

Tie-breaking criteria
For the group stage of this tournament, where two or more teams in a group tied on an equal number of points, the finishing positions will be determined by the following tie-breaking criteria in the following order:
 number of points obtained in the matches among the teams in question
 goal difference in all the group matches
 number of goals scored in all the group matches
 fair-play ranking in all the group matches
 FIFA ranking

Group A

Group B

Group C

Ranking of teams for placement matches
The ranking of the 1st, 2nd, 3rd, and 4th placed teams in each group to determine the placement matches:

Placement matches

Eleventh-place match

Ninth-place match

Seventh-place match

Fifth-place match

Third-place match

Final

Final standings

Goalscorers
4 goals
 Sofia Jakobsson

3 goals

 Marta
 Sanne Troelsgaard Nielsen
 Eugénie Le Sommer
 Alexandra Popp
 Solveig Gulbrandsen

2 goals

 Andressa
 Pernille Harder
 Gaëtane Thiney
 Dzsenifer Marozsán
 Anja Mittag
 Kozue Ando
 Dolores Silva
 Caroline Seger
 Lara Dickenmann
 Carli Lloyd

1 goal

 Bia
 Bruna
 Gu Yasha
 Wang Shanshan
 Xu Yanlu
 Caroline Rask
 Johanna Rasmussen
 Camille Abily
 Kenza Dali
 Claire Lavogez
 Simone Laudehr
 Célia Šašić
 Yuri Kawamura
 Nahomi Kawasumi
 Aya Miyama
 Yuika Sugasawa
 Kumi Yokoyama
 Melissa Bjånesøy
 Emilie Haavi
 Ada Hegerberg
 Isabell Herlovsen
 Ingrid Moe Wold
 Trine Bjerke Rønning
 Laura Luís
 Cláudia Neto
 Filipa Rodrigues
 Kosovare Asllani
 Lotta Schelin
 Fabienne Humm
 Rahel Kiwic
 Lia Wälti
 Julie Johnston
 Alex Morgan
 Christen Press
 Amy Rodriguez
 Abby Wambach

References

External links

Official website

 
2015
2015 in women's association football
2014–15 in Portuguese football
March 2015 sports events in Europe
2015 in Portuguese women's sport